Juan Antonio Portales Villarreal (born 16 May 1996) is a Mexican professional footballer who plays as a centre-back.

Honours
Monterrey
Copa MX: Apertura 2017

Atlante
Liga de Expansión MX: Apertura 2022

External links
 

Living people
1996 births
Mexican footballers
Association football defenders
C.F. Monterrey players
Atlético San Luis footballers
Liga MX players
Ascenso MX players
Liga Premier de México players
Tercera División de México players
Sportspeople from Tampico, Tamaulipas
Footballers from Tamaulipas